Mad Sin is a German psychobilly group that began in 1987. Their style is not "...constrained by the psychobilly tag but veer[s] into punk, country and metal influences too."

Style
Mad Sin, formed in 1987, have been inspired by horror punk and B-movie, with a theatrical style. Without abandoning the psycho-horror lyrical content, their musical arrangements have widened to incorporate other variables. That attitude blasts through Mad Sin's sped-up combination of rockabilly, punk, white-trash blues and tongue-in-cheek sarcasm.

History

1980s
Founded 1987 by Koefte De Ville, who had just dropped out of school, punk and rockabilly guitarist Stein and four-week-bass-playing Holly, they struggled around with the help of some friends, who organized gigs in several shady bars of Berlin. They played as street musicians in shopping malls, where they played rockabilly, country, and blues songs to get the tourist's money.

2010
On April 23, 2010, Mad Sin released their eleventh album Burn and Rise on People Like You records.

2020
On September 11, 2020, Mad Sin released their twelfth album Unbreakable on Century Media.

Side projects 
Koefte formed a side project called Dead Kings with members of Batmobile, Nekromantix, Klingonz & Milwaukee Wildmen. Holly, his brother, and Tex followed their Rockabilly roots and Dusty Gray and His Rough Riding Ramblers. Stein joined the United Swindlers with members of Frantic Flintstones and Ripmen. Peter Sandorff is a member of the Psychobilly band Hola Ghost.
Valle, Tex Morton and Andy Laaf are the "Berlin Three" of U.S. Bombs and One Man Army Drummer Chip Hanna in his Country/Americana project Chip Hanna & The Berlin Three which Chip started in 2006.

Members

Core 
Koefte Deville (Birthname: Mourad Calvies) - Vocals
Valle - Bass and Backing Vocals
Manny Anzaldo - Guitar and Backing Vocals
Andy Kandil - Guitar and Backing Vocals
KO Ristolainen - Drums

Other members 
 Hellvis - Backing Vocals

Guest members 
Tommy Gun - Drums
Micha - Drums
Nick 13 - Vocals
Patricia Day - Vocals
Lars Frederiksen - Vocals
Hulk Hogan - Vocals ("Brrrother!")

Albums 
Chills and Thrills in a Drama of Mad Sins and Mystery (1988)
Distorted Dimensions (1990)
Amphigory (1991)
Break the Rules (1992)
A Ticket into Underworld (1993)
God Save the Sin (1996)
Sweet & Innocent?... Loud & Dirty! (1998)
Survival Of The Sickest (2002)
Dead Moon's Calling (2005)
Teachin' the Goodies (2006)
20 Years in Sin Sin (2007)
Burn and Rise (2010)
25 Years - Still Mad  (2012)
Unbreakable (2020)

Videography 
 Scarred ol'heart
 All This and More (1998)
 Cursed (2010)
 Nine lives (2012)

References

External links 
 
 Official Myspace Page

Psychobilly groups
German punk rock groups